Sigrid Solbakk Raabe (born 5 September 1996), known mononymously as Sigrid, is a Norwegian singer-songwriter. She has released two studio albums, Sucker Punch (2019) and How to Let Go (2022), both of which charted in Norway and the United Kingdom. She has also released two EPs.

Early life
Sigrid Solbakk Raabe was born in Ålesund to Håkon Raabe and Anette Sølberg Solbakk on 5 September 1996. She has two older siblings, a brother, Tellef, who is also a musician, and a sister, Johanne. At her first performance, in kindergarten, she had to be pulled off the stage after crying. She began playing the piano at age 7 and began singing at age 13. When she was 13, she performed a version of Nirvana's "Smells Like Teen Spirit". In her early youth, she planned to become a teacher or lawyer or journalist, thinking a career in music would be too uncertain. 

In her first year of high school, she realized that music was more than just a hobby. When she was 17, she and her sister Johanne started a band called Sala Says Mhyp, which was named after their late cat, Sala. After finishing high school in Ålesund, Sigrid moved to Bergen for its indie music scene, living in a shared flat with her brother and friends. She was a college drop out.

Career
At the age of 16 she wrote her first song, "Sun", after her brother, Tellef Raabe, who is also a musician, told her to stop performing cover versions of Adele songs at performances and challenged her to write a song that she could perform at one of his gigs. In 2013, she released "Sun" as her debut single. The song received airplay on Norwegian radio stations. She signed to Petroleum Records the following year and performed at festivals such as Øyafestivalen.

In 2016, in partnership with Martin Sjølie, she wrote "Don't Kill My Vibe", inspired by an incident where a producer belittled and patronized her in a songwriting session. After executives at Island Records heard the song, they immediately signed her to a recording contract. On 5 May 2017 she released her debut EP which was named after the song. The EP charted in Norway, Australia, and the United Kingdom. In the spring and summer of 2017, Sigrid performed at The Great Escape Festival, Roskilde Festival, Glastonbury Festival, Latitude Festival, and the Reading and Leeds Festivals. She was also a part of The Sims 4: Parenthood soundtrack with the Simlish version of her song, "Don't Kill My Vibe". She is also featured on the 2017 Justice League soundtrack, performing a cover of Leonard Cohen's 1988 classic "Everybody Knows".

In January 2018, Sigrid was announced as the winner of BBC Music Sound of 2018. On 10 February 2018, she was a guest presenter for an episode of The Playlist for CBBC. In the same month, Sigrid won the Newcomer of the Year award at Spellemannprisen. On 11 July 2018, Raw, her second EP, which features 5 tracks was released.

On 8 March 2019, Sigrid's debut album, Sucker Punch, was released. The album consists of 12 tracks, including five songs released prior to the album. In 2019, Sigrid toured with Maroon 5 for the Red Pill Blues Tour in Europe, was the support act for George Ezra's tour across the United Kingdom, and headlined a tour in North America and Europe. Sigrid contributed a song, "Home to You" for The Aeronauts soundtrack. She was listed in Forbes "30 under 30" for European Entertainment in 2019.

In 2020, Sigrid was one of many artists that took part in a BBC Radio 1 Live Lounge cover of the Foo Fighters song "Times Like These" that was organised to raise funds for the COVID-19 pandemic.

In November 2021, Sigrid performed in Dingle, Ireland as part of the twentieth series of the live music series Other Voices.

Sigrid's second album, the 12-track How to Let Go, was released on 6 May 2022.

Artistry
Sigrid's songs are underpinned by anger, melancholia, and disappointment; she says that it is easier to write about frustration than about having a nice time. For her love songs Sigrid cites Bonnie Raitt, Coldplay, Adele, Lykke Li, and Robyn as influences.

Personal life
Sigrid is a brand ambassador for Gore-Tex. While filming a commercial for the brand, she met Nikolai Schirmer, a professional skier from Tromsø. They dated, but the relationship had ended by June 2022.

Discography

Albums

Extended plays

Singles

As lead artist

As featured artist

Promotional singles

Other charted songs

Guest appearances

Songwriting credits

Music videos

As lead artist

As featured artist

Tours
Headlining
 UK & Ireland Tour (2018)
 European Tour (November 2018)
 The Sucker Punch Tour (US 2019)
 UK & EU Tour (2019)
 How To Let Go Tour (2022) - U.S. shows featured Ber as the opening act

Supporting
 Oh Wonder – European Ultralife Tour (2017)
 George Ezra – UK Arena Tour (2019)
 Maroon 5 – Red Pill Blues Tour (2019)

Awards and nominations

References

Notes

External links

 

1996 births
21st-century Norwegian singers
21st-century Norwegian women singers
English-language singers from Norway
Island Records artists
Living people
MTV Europe Music Award winners
Musicians from Ålesund
Musicians from Bergen
Norwegian pop singers
Norwegian songwriters